Herman Joseph "Ham" Schulte (born Schultehenrich; September 1, 1912 – December 21, 1993) was an American professional baseball player.  The second baseman appeared in one season in Major League Baseball as a member of the Philadelphia Phillies. Schulte was born in St. Louis, Missouri, and attended the University of Iowa. A younger brother, Len, also played in MLB as an infielder with the – St. Louis Browns.

His professional career lasted for 18 seasons (1934–1942; 1946–1951), with the 1943–1945 campaigns missed due to his World War II service in the United States Army. During the 1930s, he spent five years at the top levels of the New York Yankees' farm system, until his trade to the Phillies in March 1940. 

In his one MLB season, he compiled a .236 batting average in 436 at-bats, with 18 doubles, two triples, one home run and 21 runs batted in. His lone homer came August 16 at the Polo Grounds off Hal Schumacher of the New York Giants in a 5–3 loss, one of the 103 defeats suffered by the Phillies in 1940. 

Schulte returned to the high levels of minor league baseball in 1941–1942, then became a player-manager in the minors after returning from the war. He died in St. Charles, Missouri, at the age of 81.

References

External links

1912 births
1993 deaths
United States Army personnel of World War II
Baseball players from St. Louis
Big Stone Gap Rebels players
Birmingham Barons players
Des Moines Demons players
Hollywood Stars players
Kansas City Blues (baseball) players
Lincoln A's players
Major League Baseball second basemen
Minor league baseball managers
Newark Bears (IL) players
Oakland Oaks (baseball) players
Ogden Reds players
People from St. Charles, Missouri
Philadelphia Phillies players
Springfield Giants (Ohio) players
Tulsa Oilers (baseball) players